The Baldwin family is an American family of professional performers, including the four acting siblings Alec, Daniel, William, and Stephen, who are known collectively as the Baldwin brothers.

Ancestry
The Baldwin family’s patrilineal line traces to a Richard Baldwin, who lived in England, c. the 1500s. Through their father Alexander Rae Baldwin Jr., the Baldwins are descended from the Mayflower  passenger John Howland. The four brothers are therefore the 13th generation of their family to be born in North America.

Members
 The four Baldwin brothers:
 Alec
 Daniel
 Billy
 Stephen
 Present or former wives / partners to the Baldwin brothers:
 Kim Basinger – ex-wife of Alec
 Hilaria Baldwin – wife of Alec
 Isabella Hofmann – former partner of Daniel
 Chynna Phillips – wife of William
 Kennya Baldwin – wife of Stephen
 Baldwin brothers' children and their spouses/partners:
 Ireland – daughter of Alec
 Hailey – daughter of Stephen 
 Justin Bieber - husband of Hailey
Actors Adam Baldwin and A. Michael Baldwin are not related to the family.

Family tree

Hollywood
Three of the four brothers (Daniel, William, and Stephen) appear in the Oliver Stone film Born on the Fourth of July.

In 1996, E! True Hollywood Story produced a television documentary about the brothers, eponymously titled The Baldwin Brothers.

In popular culture 

 In the 1995 film Clueless, "Baldwin" is used as a slang term for an attractive male, coined by writer-director Amy Heckerling after the four brothers.
 In the 1999 film South Park: Bigger, Longer & Uncut, when the United States declares war against Canada, the Royal Canadian airforce are depicted bombing the Baldwins (along with another acting dynasty, the Arquettes) as a pre-emptive strike.

See also
Baldwin (name)

References